KPYV (AM 1340) is a radio station based in Chico, California and licensed to Oroville, California, United States. The station is owned by the Roman Catholic Diocese of Sacramento, through licensee Radio Santisimo Sacramento, Inc. The station used to be an affiliate of ESPN Radio and Fox Sports Radio. On September 24, 2013, the then-KEWE changed its format to adult alternative. In 2014 it changed to Spanish Catholic.

History
The station went on the air with the call sign KAOR. It was assigned the call letters KORV on April 4, 1973, then KJAZ on October 1, 1996. On May 17, 2000, the station changed its call sign to KEWE, and again to KNTF on September 27, 2013. On June 3, 2014, the station changed its call sign to the current KPYV.

References

External links

FCC History Cards for KPYV

Radio stations established in 1996
PYV